The 1979 Seattle Seahawks season was the team's fourth season in the National Football League (NFL). The Seahawks had a winning record for the second consecutive year, matching their 9–7 record from 1978.

Starting off the season with a 1–4 record, the Seahawks rallied to finish 9–7. Season highlights included a sweep of the Oakland Raiders for the second straight year, and winning both of their Monday Night Football contests on the road against the Atlanta Falcons and at home against the New York Jets, where Jim Zorn completed 13 passes in a row in a 30–7 victory. The team also enjoyed their first victory over the Denver Broncos 28–23 on a 43-yard touchdown pass from Zorn to Largent in the final minutes.

Season lowlights included a 37–34 loss in Denver, after leading 34–10 midway through the 3rd quarter. The Los Angeles Rams shut out the Seattle Seahawks 24–0, holding the Seahawks to −7 yards total offense, and only one first down. The team lost twice to the Kansas City Chiefs, including a 37–21 defeat in week 14 that eliminated Seattle from playoff contention. The team also lost running back David Sims, who led the AFC in touchdowns in 1978, to a career-ending injury.

The 1979 season was the franchise's last winning season until 1983 when new coach Chuck Knox led the Seahawks to their first playoff berth and Championship game appearance.

1979 NFL draft

Personnel

Staff

Final roster
{{NFL final roster
|Year=1979
|TeamName=Seattle Seahawks
|BC1=#00338D
|FC1=white
|BDC1=#008542
|offseason=no
|ufa=no
|rfa=no
|erfa=no
|Active=51
|Inactive=0
|PS=0

|Quarterbacks=

|Running Backs=

 FB

|Wide Receivers= *
|Tight Ends=

|Offensive Linemen=
 T T
 G
 T
 C
 G G
 C

|Defensive Linemen=
 DE
 DT
 DT/DE
 DE DE
 DT DE
 DT

|Linebackers=

|Defensive Backs=
 S
 CB S

 S
 CB|Special Teams=
 PR
 K
 KR
 P

|Reserve Lists=

|Practice Squad=
}}

     Starters in bold.
 (*) Denotes players that were selected for the 1980 Pro Bowl.

Schedule

Preseason

Source: Seahawks Media Guides1980 Seahawks Media Guide, accessed February 14, 2015.

Regular season
Divisional matchups have the AFC West playing the NFC West.Bold''' indicates division opponents.
Source: 1979 NFL season results

Standings

Game summaries
For the second straight year, the Seahawks missed the playoffs by one game. Season highlights included sweeping the Oakland Raiders for the 2nd straight year, and defeating the Denver Broncos for the 1st time in team history in a comeback thriller 28–23 at the Kingdome, and winning the team's first appearance on MNF over the Atlanta Falcons, 31–28. The team started out 3–5, and  had a 6–2 finish. A 37–21 loss to the Kansas City Chiefs in week 14 knocked them out of playoff contention, but rebounded to end their season repeating 1978 at 9–7.

Preseason

Week P1: vs. Minnesota Vikings

Week P2: vs. Dallas Cowboys

Week P3: at Los Angeles Rams

Week P4: vs. San Francisco 49ers

Regular season

Week 1: vs. San Diego Chargers

Week 2: at Miami Dolphins

Week 3: vs. Oakland Raiders

Week 4: at Denver Broncos

Week 5: vs. Kansas City Chiefs

Week 6: at San Francisco 49ers

Week 7: at San Diego Chargers

Week 8: vs. Houston Oilers

Week 9: at Atlanta Falcons

Week 10: vs. Los Angeles Rams

With -7 total yards and just one first down, this is the fewest yards the Seahawks have ever gained in one match. It is the most recent – and only since 1970 – occasion when an NFL team has gained just one first down for an entire match, although the Denver Broncos did not gain a single first down in a 1966 game with the Houston Oilers.

Week 11: at Cleveland Browns

Week 12: vs. New Orleans Saints

Week 13: vs. New York Jets

Week 14: at Kansas City Chiefs

Week 15: vs. Denver Broncos

Week 16: at Oakland Raiders

Awards and records
Steve Largent, NFL Leader in Receiving Yards, (1,237)

References

External links
 Seahawks draft history at NFL.com
 1979 NFL season results at NFL.com

Seattle
Seattle Seahawks seasons